Second Hand is a 2013 Indian Telugu-language romantic drama starring Dhanya Balakrishna, Sudheer Varma, Kireeti Damaraju, Sree Vishnu and Anuj Ram. This film marks the debut of writer B. V. S. Ravi as a co-producer and Telugu debut of director Kishore Tirumala. Avaneedra, who previously worked for the Hindi film Bhoot Returns (2012), and  Uma Shankar were the cinematographers for the film.

Plot 
Santosh (Sudheer Varma) and Subba Rao (Kireeti Damaraju), accidentally meets and discuss their love lives. This plot begins with Santhosh a struggling photographer who decided to commit suicide to take revenge on his ex-girlfriend, Meanwhile, Subba Rao enters his home finding his Facebook friend's Address after knowing it was a wrong address Santhosh asks to record his final confession on his phone to commit suicide. Then Santhosh narrates Subba Rao his story.

Santhosh talks about his girlfriend, Deepu (Dhanya Balakrishna in Subba Rao's visualization)a jovial girl through some comical circumstances they fall in love. Later Deepu's parents sets a matrimonial match for her and a guy called Mounish who settled in Delhi. Deepu starts comparing Mounish with Santhosh which makes life hell for him. But she assured him that she will be marry only him. His friends tries to make him understand that Deepu started a process to break up with him. One day finally Deepu breaks up with Santhosh for a silly reason though Santhosh apologize lefts him. This break up makes him depressed and tries to contact her in other ways but she was no avail. After some days he came to know that Deepu had married Mounish and he went to meet her. In the conversation Santhosh understands that Deepu was a character less women despite in a relationship with him and started talking with him as an unknown friend. He decided to commit suicide because his death confession wants to make a sensation in India which makes her punish throughout lifetime.

After hearing this Subba Rao laughs his story and tells him that his story is worse than Santhosh's. Then Subba Rao narrates about his wife, Swecha (again played by Dhanya Balakrishna this time in Santhosh's visualization). Dr.Subba Rao a rich Dentist from Vijayawada a traditional guy and wants to  marry a virgin girl so he does not want to be targeted for hypocrisy. That is why he did not get involved in any affairs or in relationships earlier and not make any bad habits and all calls him 'Gentleman'. His match was fixed with Swecha a practical girl, at their traditional date she confess her past relationship with Shravanth eventually they were in a living relationship and not a virgin due to some political reasons their families not accepted for their marriage. Swecha accepts the situation and started to get move on and Subba Rao likes her genuine nature and decided to marry her. Later the Shravanth became possessive for following events in the marriage and tries to convince Swecha to call off the marriage but Swecha councils Shravanth to accept the situation which makes Subba Rao doubts on her character. After marriage Swecha  asks some time to consummate their marriage. Which Subba Rao makes irritated but being an introvert in nature he decided to wait for her. Swecha continues to meet Shravanth all the time which makes Subba Rao angry but helpless.

After hearing Subba Rao's past Santhosh feels sorry for him and decided to not commit suicide meanwhile both of them through an accident meet Sahasra (Dhanya Balakrishna this time real), becomes constoned on thinking their visualization turns into reality but later they realise that both looked her in various places. They quarrel with each other, then in the quarrel Santhosh gets dehydrated. Subba Rao and Sahasra join him in a hospital. The trio meets a Doctor (Posani Krishna Murali) after hearing their quarrel decided to give an advice in their problems after hearing Santhosh and Subba Rao's past Sahasra narrates her past to them.

Sahasra'Saha' is Stuck between two men. One of them is her ex-boyfriend, Chaitanya (Sree Vishnu)'Chaitu' from Vizag and his best friend Siddu. Siddu and Sahasra are close friends and stays in a room later with Siddu's insistence Saha allows Chaitu as their roommate at beginning Saha feels irritated with Chaitu's granted nature but Siddu tells she misunderstands about him. Later a Tamil guy called Saravanan(Kishore Tirumala) a one side lover to Saha proposing her since 2 years which gets some comic relief, later Chaitu involves and bashes Saravanan for irritating Saha eventually falls for him and proposes to him with the support of Siddu. Soon Chaitu and Saha cross their limits which results to Saha pregnancy. After hearing this suddenly Chaitu disappears from them. Then no option left she informs it to Siddu then Siddu Stands for her and get her aborted unknown of both the parents. Later Chaitu turns up and shows his granted attitude then Saha breaks up with him and Siddu bangs him out for his betrayal to love and friendship. Later Saha became depressed for the events then Siddu offers his support by marrying her she eventually accepts. Then suddenly Chaitu appears to Saha and explains his situation for not turning up and expressed to marry her and now he is ready to face the society and confess his love after observing his sincerity Saha became confused whom to choose after knowing the facts even Siddu confess his love towards her. Then the trio meet up again and discussed whom is she happy with but the answer is not found.

After hearing their stories Doctor conforms that issues is with them not with others he conforms that Santhosh is incompetent enough to provide her so she practically thinks and moved on he needs to know the difference between fantasy and reality and advice him to focus on his Carrier. Then Doctor conforms that Subbarao's problem is with skepticism he believes Swecha is loyal to Subba Rao he must understand that he needs to give some time to her, spend some time with her to cope up and advises to show his love on her then she may forget the past soon. Then the Doctor comes to Sahasra that she does not have any clarity on her choices because she is expecting 100% love on them but she actually can not provide 100% love on any of them; it is a foolishness to expect 100% love from others which you can not provide for. Then the Doctor advice Sahasra "you need to think in open mind then you will get your solution". After the discussion the Doctor takes leave from them and discharges Santhosh.

Finally the film ends with the matured trio part their ways with the solutions they got. Santhosh decided to focus on his career, Subba Rao decided to be Romantic with his wife went back to Vijayawada and Sahasra realised that every men is not perfect and she had taken a decision which is not revealed.

Cast 
Dhanya Balakrishna in three roles as:
 Sahasra,'Saha' a woman who is struggling who to choose between two men
Deepu, Santhosh's former girlfriend
Swecha, Subbarao's wife who can not get over her former boyfriend
Sudheer Varma as Santosh, a photographer 
Kireeti Damaraju as Dr.Subba Rao.
Sree Vishnu as Chaitanya 'Chaitu', A care free youth, Sahasra's ex-boyfriend
Anuj Ram as Siddu 
Posani Krishna Murali as Love Doctor (Cameo role) 
Kishore Tirumala as Saravanan

Soundtrack 
The music was composed by Ravichandra. The lyrics were written by Kishore Tirumala, Sagar and Krishnakanth.

Release 
The Times of India gave the film two-and-a-half out of five stars and wrote that "The cinematography and editing is a bit amateur, however, it’s an interesting movie to watch". Full Hyderabad gave the film an average rating of six out of ten and stated that "Clever dialogues and an engrossing screenplay help the movie work". 123Telugu gave the film a rating of two-and-three-quarters out of five and wrote that "The film has a decent first half, with nice performances, clever screenplay and good humour".

References

External links 

Films directed by Kishore Tirumala
Indian romantic drama films
2013 romantic drama films
2013 films
2010s Telugu-language films